The River Teith is a river in Scotland, which is formed from the confluence of two smaller rivers, the Garbh Uisge (River Leny) and Eas Gobhain at Callander, Stirlingshire. It flows into the River Forth near Drip north-west of Stirling.

Etymology 
The name Teith is obscure, but may come from the Scottish Gaelic Uisge Theamhich, which translates into English as the "quiet and pleasant water".

The place-name Callander may conserve an older name for the Teith, derived from Brittonic *caleto-dubro, meaning "hard-water".

Course 
The Teith is formed from the confluence of two smaller rivers: one from Loch Venachar, the Eas Gobhain which translates as "the smith's cascade", and one from Loch Lubnaig - Garbh Uisge which translates as "the rough water". The Teith continues to Deanston and Doune where the Ardoch Burn meets it, before its confluence with the (smaller) Forth upstream of Stirling.

Importance 

The Deanston Distillery near Doune uses the Teith to supply water for the manufacture of Deanston Single Malt Whisky.

The 'Brig o' Teith' was constructed in 1535 by Robert Spittal, a Royal tailor to Margaret Tudor, wife of James IV. According to Charles Rogers in A Week at Bridge of Allan (1851), a ferryman refused Spittal passage across the Teith as he did not have his purse and could not pay. The bridge was built in retaliation.

References

External links 

 "Forth District Salmon Fishery Board"
 "River Forth Fisheries Trust"
 "Doune Historical Notes - Moray S MacKay

Teith
1Teith
Tributaries of the River Forth
Kilmadock